3C 66A is a blazar located in the constellation Andromeda.

The "distance" of a far away galaxy depends on the distance measurement used.  With a redshift of 0.444, light from this active galaxy is estimated to have taken around 4.5 billion years to reach Earth.  But as a result of the expansion of the Universe, the present (co-moving) distance to this galaxy is about 5.4 billion light-years (1647 Mpc).  Even at this great distance this blazar has an apparent magnitude of about 15.5. Although 0.444 is used as the common redshift value, 0.3347 is a new strict lower limit "inferred through observing the far-UV absorption by the low-z IGM."

3C 66A underwent an optical outburst in 2007 August, as monitored by the Tuorla blazar monitoring program.  The event was monitored by the Whole Earth Blazar Telescope project.

References

External links
 Wikisky image of 3C 66A with 3C 66B (PGC 9067) near the lower left
 The galaxy 3C 66B with 3C 66A in the North-West

Blazars
3C 66
BL Lacertae objects
066A
Andromeda (constellation)